The 1907 Targa Florio was a Grand Prix motor race held at Madonie on 22 April 1907. It was run over 3 laps of the 92.473 mile circuit, totaling 277.42 miles.

Results

See also 
1906 Targa Florio

Sources

II Targa Florio

<La Saga des Pilain Lyonnaises, Claude Rouxel, editions du Palmier 2008>
Targa Florio
Targa Florio
Targa Florio